Brownphora is a genus of flies in the family Phoridae.

Species
Brownphora sinefurca (Borgmeier, 1969)

References

Phoridae
Platypezoidea genera